Ken-Levi Eikeland (born 9 October 1994) is a Norwegian racing cyclist. He competed in the men's team time trial event at the 2017 UCI Road World Championships.

Major results
2016
 1st Stage 1 Carpathian Couriers Race

References

External links
 

1994 births
Living people
Norwegian male cyclists
People from Larvik
Sportspeople from Vestfold og Telemark